A. Madhavan (7 February 1934 – 5 January 2021) was a Tamil writer who won the Sahitya Akademi Award for his collection of essays Ilakkiya Chuvadukal (Traces of Literature). He supported the Dravidian movement.

Biography 
Madhavan was born in Thiruvananthapuram to Chellammal and Avudainayagam. He had a small business in the main bazaar of Chalai, Thiruvananthapuram. He had one son and two daughters and was living with his elder daughter until his death. He died on 5 January 2021.

Selected works 
 Punalum Manalum (On a River’s Bank)
 Krishna Parunthu (Brahmini Kite)
 Thoovaanam (Drizzle)
 Kaalai (Bull)
 Ettavathu Naal (Eighth Day)

Translations from Malayalam to Tamil: 
  Malayatoor Ramakrishnan's Yakshi (A Mythical Being)
  P.K. Balakrishnan’s Ini Gnan Urangatte (And Now, Let Me sleep)
  Karur Neelakanta Pillai’s Sammaanam (Reward)

References 

1934 births
2021 deaths
Tamil-language writers
Recipients of the Sahitya Akademi Award in Tamil
Writers from Thiruvananthapuram
Tamil–Malayalam translators